SCJ may refer to:

 Justice of the Supreme Court of the United Kingdom
 Sacré-Coeur de Jésus (Sacred Heart of Jesus), which is used by two Catholic orders:
 Congregation of the Sacred Heart of Jesus, also known as Timon David fathers after their founder (Joseph-Marie Timon-David in 1852)
 Priests of the Sacred Heart, founded by Leon Dehon in 1878
 Science Council of Japan
 SCJ: The Sydney Cinema Journal, an Australian journal, published 1966–1968 by Ken Quinnell and Michael Thornhill
 Shincheonji Church of Jesus the Temple of the Tabernacle of the Testimony which is a religious group in South Korea founded by Lee Man-hee  
 Sixteenth Century Journal
 Society for Collegiate Journalists
 Squamocolumnar junction, part of the cervix
 Sterno-Clavicular Joint
 Superior Court of Justice (disambiguation), various entities